Lagocheirus obsoletus is a species of longhorn beetles of the subfamily Lamiinae. It has been found in the south-western United States, Mexico, Costa Rica, Cuba and Jamaica.

References

Beetles described in 1860
Lagocheirus